LFU may refer to

Lacrimal functional unit, primary source of lacritin in the body
Least frequently used, algorithm
Lebanese Forces – Executive Command, formerly known as "Lebanese Forces – Uprising"
LFU 205, monoplane
Leopold-Franzens-Universität Innsbruck, Austria